<onlyinclude>This is a list of administrators and governors of Imo State, Nigeria. Imo State was created on 17 March 1976 from part of East Central State.

Governors of Imo State 

Imo